The Indian National Congress is one of the leading political parties in India. The state or Union territory (UT) president is the highest command of the Indian National Congresss' Pradesh Congress Committee, which is the state and UT level entity responsible for indulging in political campaigns at state level. Also known as the leader of the state and UT party, it is chosen by the party president, which is the highest command of INC. The state and UT president is the higher decision making body of the Pradesh Congress Committee. The state or UT president is accountable of constituting subordinate Congress committee viz. District committee, block committee  and for each panchayat development block or panchayat samiti.

Presently INC has state and UT president for all states and UTs of India.


List

States President

Union territories President

See also
List of presidents of the Indian National Congress
List of chief ministers from the Indian National Congress

References

External links
 PCC website

 
Lists of current office-holders in India